Dorothy Dene (1859 – 27 December 1899), born Ada Alice Pullen, was an English stage actress and artist's model for the painter Frederick Leighton and some of his associates. Dene was considered to have a classical face and figure and a flawless complexion. Her height was above average and she had long arms, large violet eyes and abundant golden chestnut hair.

Biography
Dene was born in New Cross, London, in 1859; her birth name was Ada Alice Pullen. She came from a large family of girls, a number of whom earned their living from acting on stage. She lived with her four sisters in an apartment in South Kensington, London.

Career as a model

According to a story published in 1897, Leighton chose her as the one woman in Europe whose face and figure most closely tallied with his ideal. Leighton searched Europe for a model suitable for his 1884 painting Cymon and Iphigenia, eventually finding Dene in a theatre in London. However, the story about her being found in a theatre is contradicted in Leighton's biography, written by Emilia Barrington right after his death. According to Barrington, Dene was spotted by the artist at the doorstep of a painter's studio close to Leighton's. The studio mentioned was probably that of Louise Starr Canziani in Kensington Green where she was already working as a model. She sat for Leighton when he painted Bianca in 1881.

Aside from Cymon and Iphigenia Dene appeared as the maiden catching the ball in Leighton's |url=https://upload.wikimedia.org/wikipedia/commons/b/b2/Greek-girls-playing-at-ball.jpg |title=Greek Girls Playing Ball. Her long arms embellish the painter's Summer Moon. She also was the model for his Captive Andromache, The Garden of the Hesperides,

John Everett Millais and George Frederic Watts also used Dene as a model.

Relationship with Leighton

There have been rumours that Leighton had a romantic interest in Dene, but nothing has ever been substantiated. Leighton's sexuality remains a matter of debate. He remained a bachelor and, according to art historian Richard Louis Ormond who together with his wife Leonée wrote Leighton's biography, acknowledged he "fulfilled some part of himself in the company of young men". However, Leighton's friend, Italian artist Giovanni Costa makes some mysterious references to the artist's "wife" in letters to their mutual friend George Howard, 9th Earl of Carlisle. It has been speculated that they refer to Dene.

Leighton assisted Dene in her acting career; educating her and introducing her to "fashionable society", and it has been speculated that George Bernard Shaw "drew upon their relationship" for his play Pygmalion.

At his death, he left her £5,000, plus another £5,000 in trust for herself and her sisters (this was the equivalent of around one million pounds today), which was by far the largest bequest he made.

Acting career
Ada Alice became "Dorothy Dene" in 1882 when Leighton became Ada's benefactor. It was adopted as a stage name for her theatrical career. "Dorothy" was chosen by Ada in reference to her younger sister who died in 1877 and the surname Dene was chosen by Leighton.

Dene made her debut as an actress as Marin in The School For Scandal in 1886. She appeared in New York City in a play produced by the Theater of Arts and Letters and performed in other venues there. She found little success as a performer in America and her tour was eventually abandoned. In Britain her skill as an actress did not go unnoticed. In 1894, in a tour of A Woman of No Importance, she alternated the roles of Mrs Allonby and Mrs Arbuthnot with the company's other leading lady, Florence West: critics complimented Dene on contrasting the two very different characters successfully. One wrote that she rose "to a height of intense emotional power" in the latter role, another that she played the former "with much charm and grace of manner".  

She died in London in 1899, at the age of forty and is buried in Kensal Green Cemetery.

References

 Lima, Ohio Times Democrat, Searching for a Model, 28 May 1897, Page 6.
 North Adams, Massachusetts Evening Transcript, Most Beautiful English Woman, Tuesday, 10 May 1898.
 Ogden Utah Standard, A Beautiful Actress, Saturday, 24 December 1892, Page 7.

External links

On the Trail of Dorothy Dene: Actress, Model and Muse  Speaker: Philippa Martin.
"Ode to the Muse": a good short biography, with pictures, from the Art Magick website.

1859 births
1899 deaths
English artists' models
English female models
English stage actresses
19th-century English actresses
Muses
Burials at Kensal Green Cemetery